Victor Nicky Wegnez (born 25 December 1995) is a Belgian field hockey player who plays as a midfielder for Racing Club de Bruxelles and the Belgium national team.

Club career
Wegnez played in the youth academy of Royal Daring and he played for their senior squad until 2017 when he transferred to KHC Dragons. After one season with the Dragons, he joined Racing Club de Bruxelles in 2018. In January 2020, he signed a two-year contract extension at Racing. In the 2021–22 season, he won his second Belgian league title, now with Racing.

International career
In 2016, Wegnez reached the final of the 2016 Junior World Cup and he was part of the Belgian selection that qualified for the final at the 2017 European Championship in Amsterdam. In November 2018, he was selected for the 2018 World Cup, which they eventually won by defeating the Netherlands in the final. At the 2019 EuroHockey Championship, where Belgium won its first European title, he was named the player of the tournament. In December 2019, he was nominated for the FIH Player of the Year Award. On 25 May 2021, he was selected in the squad for the 2021 EuroHockey Championship.

Honours

Club
Dragons
 Belgian Hockey League: 2017–18

Racing
 Belgian Hockey League: 2021–22

International
Belgium
 Olympic gold medal: 2020
 World Cup: 2018
 EuroHockey Championship: 2019
 FIH Pro League: 2020–21

Individual
 EuroHockey Championship Player of the Tournament: 2019
 Hockey World League Final Best Junior Player: 2017

References

External links

1995 births
Living people
Belgian male field hockey players
Male field hockey midfielders
KHC Dragons players
2018 Men's Hockey World Cup players
Field hockey players from Brussels
Men's Belgian Hockey League players
Royal Racing Club Bruxelles players
Field hockey players at the 2020 Summer Olympics
Olympic field hockey players of Belgium
Olympic gold medalists for Belgium
Medalists at the 2020 Summer Olympics
Olympic medalists in field hockey
Royal Daring players
2023 Men's FIH Hockey World Cup players